William Gary Whatcott (born 16 October 1967), known as Bill Whatcott, is a Canadian social conservative activist who campaigns against homosexuality and abortion. The dramatic nature of his activities have attracted attention from the media, including an appearance on The Daily Show. He has also run for political office in Toronto, Saskatchewan and Edmonton.

Biography
Whatcott was born in Toronto, Ontario and spent his youth in a number of foster homes, where he reports having been physically and mentally abused. At the age of 14 he went to live on the street. At age 18 he reports having found God, who transformed his life. He spent time in jail and a group home, and the latter helped him enroll in nursing school. In 1991, he graduated from Humber College, receiving his diploma in Practical Nursing with Honours, and was granted his nursing licence from the Ontario College of Nurses. Later that year, he moved to Saskatchewan, where he worked at a Salvation Army senior home before beginning employment for the Regina Health District.

Whatcott wrote an autobiography detailing his childhood, conversion, activism and journey to the Supreme Court of Canada called Born in a Graveyard.

Activism
In Regina he expanded his public campaign against abortion and homosexuality, with his goal to make both activities illegal. One of his most notable activities has been to travel to different Canadian cities and place graphic flyers in mailboxes. These include flyers with images of dismembered fetuses and flyers with pictures of diseases allegedly caused by gay sex. He has also protested at gay pride celebrations and outside abortion clinics. On occasion he has also taken up other causes, including distributing flyers describing Muhammad as "a man of violence" with images of a beheaded Indonesian girl. In 2001 he held a Heterosexual Pride Day parade in Regina. After the event turned out to be focused on anti-homosexual displays and speeches the city did not approve the event in subsequent years.
The graphic nature of his literature, and his protests have gotten him in repeated legal trouble. He has been arrested six times in Saskatchewan, but never convicted of any charge. He has also been arrested once in the United States and 20 times in Ontario and successfully prosecuted twice for violating the bubble zone, an injunction which bars all prayers and protests from within  of the abortion clinic. On Sept 2 1994, he was convicted the first time for his activism, receiving a six-month stint in jail for violating the bubble zones around at Scott's abortion clinic in Toronto by protesting at the clinic's entrance.

In 2005, he was fined $17,500 by the Saskatchewan Human Rights Tribunal for distributing material deemed hateful by the Human Rights Tribunal. His activities were investigated by the Edmonton police, for what one constable called an "affront on the basic tenets of our society," but no charges were laid.

He has also repeatedly run for political office. In the 1999 Ontario election he ran for the Family Coalition Party in the riding of Toronto Centre, finishing eighth with 232 votes. In 2000 he ran for mayor of Regina, finishing fourth of eight with 344 votes. In 2007 he ran for mayor of Edmonton finishing sixth of nine with 1665 votes. He was also a frequent contributor to the conservative website Free Dominion, from which he was eventually banned.

In 2002 Whatcott was interviewed by Ed Helms for The Daily Show. He appeared before the Supreme Court of Canada on 12 October 2011 to defend his views on homosexuality. As the judges and lawyers prepared to hear his case, he delivered 3,000 more flyers on homosexuality throughout Ottawa, including Carleton University Campus. More interveners appeared in Whatcott's case – 21 in total: 7 for and 14 against – than in any other Supreme Court case in the history of Canada.

A documentary was made on Whatcott's conversion to Christianity and his anti-abortion and anti-gay crusades, which have landed him in front of multiple courts, tribunals, and finally the Supreme Court of Canada. The film featured prominently at Ottawa's Free Thinking Film Festival on 12 November 2011.

In August 2014, Whatcott infiltrated the Vancouver Pride parade. He marched with the false alias of Matthew Davidson with the Church of the Flying Spaghetti Monster. He and his group handed out fake condoms which were actually leaflets with messages against homosexuality.

Whatcott has also appeared at several universities around Canada including the University of Calgary and the University of Regina where he was met with protest from students.

In 2017 Whatcott printed and handed out fliers with transphobic content against Morgane Oger who was running for provincial office. The B.C. Human Rights Tribunal would later order Whatcott to pay $55,000 to Oger as compensation.

Nursing licence
On 25 January 2005, the Saskatchewan Association of Licensed Practical Nurses suspended Whatcott's nursing licence for 45 days and ordered him to pay a $15,000 fine. They asserted that Whatcott had intimidated patients and staff outside a Regina Planned Parenthood clinic by picketing and referring "to its workers as murderers, abortionists and disseminators of AIDS". Whatcott insisted that he was well within his rights of free speech as a private citizen to protest the clinic, as he was off duty and made no reference to his professional status. The judge disagreed and upheld the fine.

On appeal, a Saskatchewan appeals court overturned the ruling by the trial judge, and on 29 May 2008, the Supreme Court of Canada upheld the appeals court view that Whatcott's activities off duty were protected by the right of free speech and could not be used to suspend his nursing licence. According to Whatcott's lawyer, if the original ruling had stood, it could have affected other professionals, such as lawyers or teachers, who take unpopular views.

Human Rights Tribunal ruling and second Supreme Court of Canada case

On 25 February 2010, Whatcott had the Saskatchewan Human Rights Tribunal ruling against him alleging discrimination against four homosexuals and fining him $17,500 overturned by the Saskatchewan Court of Appeal. Part of the judgment acquitting Whatcott read, "the manner in which children in the public school system are to be exposed to messages about different forms of sexuality and sexual identity is inherently controversial. It must always be open to public debate. That debate will sometimes be polemical and impolite."

The Saskatchewan Human Rights Commission appealed to the Supreme Court of Canada, which decided to hear the case.

Whatcott appeared before the Supreme Court of Canada on 12 October 2011 to defend his views on homosexuality. While the judges and lawyers were preparing to hear Whatcott's case, the activist delivered 3,000 more flyers on homosexuality throughout Ottawa and got thrown off the Carleton University campus for delivering the flyers there. More interveners appeared in Whatcott's case both for and against him, than in any other Supreme Court case in the history of Canada. Intervening on behalf of Whatcott were the Canadian Constitution Foundation, the Canadian Civil Liberties Association, Canadian Journalists for Free Expression, the Christian Legal Fellowship, the Evangelical Fellowship of Canada, the Catholic Civil Rights League and the Faith + Freedom Alliance. Intervening against Whatcott were Attorney General of Alberta, Canadian Human Rights Commission, Alberta Human Rights Commission, Egale Canada Inc., Ontario Human Rights Commission, Canadian Jewish Congress, Unitarian Congregation of Saskatoon and Canadian Unitarian Council, Women's Legal Education and Action Fund, Canadian Bar Association, Northwest Territories Human Rights Commission and Yukon Human Rights Commission, League for Human Rights of B'nai B'rith Canada, United Church of Canada, Assembly of First Nations, Federation of Saskatchewan Indian Nations and Métis Nation-Saskatchewan and the African Canadian Legal Clinic.

In February 2013, the Court released its reasons in Saskatchewan Human Rights Commission v Whatcott. The Court held that, although Bible passages, biblical beliefs and the principles derived from those beliefs can be legally and reasonably advanced in public discourse, speech which can be described as "detestation" and "vilification" cannot be. Whatcott was ordered to pay compensation to recipients of the flyers.

CBC lawsuit
Whatcott sued the Canadian Broadcasting Corporation over an October 2011 broadcast that included a 2008 flyer with the words "kill the homosexuals" highlighted. Whatcott argued the flyer had nothing to do with the Supreme Court case being discussed by the broadcast (which involved flyers from 2000 and 2001) and that the phrase had been taken out of context (which included a disclaimer on the reverse saying no violence was being advocated). Whatcott initially won the defamation case, but CBC won an appeal in November 2015.

Toronto Pride Parade
In 2016, Whatcott and others infiltrated the Toronto Pride Parade disguised as "gay zombies" wearing green body-suits under the alias of the "Cannabis Consumers' Association". They distributed flyers disguised as "safe sex" packages. The flyers contained graphic depictions of sexually transmitted infections and claimed that homosexual sex puts people at risk of these infections. They also criticized politicians of the Liberal Party, including Justin Trudeau and Kathleen Wynne, for their support of gay activism, and encouraged readers to repent of homosexuality.

For this, a lawyer named Douglas Elliott filed a civil suit against Whatcott seeking damages of $104 million CAD for alleged defamation against the LGBT community and the Liberal Parties of Ontario and Canada.

In June 2018, an arrest warrant was issued for Whatcott for his actions in the parade and he turned himself in to police. A resulting class-action lawsuit was settled out of court. After a trial, Whatcott was acquitted in December 2021, but an appeal is still possible.

References

External links
 Free North America website

1967 births
Living people
Activists from Toronto
Canadian anti-abortion activists
Family Coalition Party of Ontario candidates in Ontario provincial elections